The Archdiocese of Kingston in Jamaica is an archdiocese of the Roman Rite within the Roman Catholic Church. Its area is the majority of Jamaica, including its capital, Kingston. The ecclesiastical province has three suffragan dioceses: Belize City-Belmopan, Mandeville and Montego Bay, as well as the Mission Sui Iuris of Cayman Islands. They and the archdiocese are members of the Antilles Episcopal Conference.

History 
The archdiocese was originally called the Vicariate Apostolic of Jamaica when it was erected in 1837. In 1956, it became Diocese of Kingston and included all of Jamaica. In September 1967, two suffragans were split from the diocese and the diocese was elevated to an archdiocese.

As of 2006, the diocese contains 32 parishes, 30 active diocesan priests, 27 religious priests, and 56,200 Catholics. It also has 174 religious brothers, 113 religious sisters, and 19 permanent deacons. Donald James Reece was the Archbishop between 12 April 2008 and 15 April 2011. He was succeeded by Charles Henry Dufour, former bishop of the Diocese of Montego Bay, who was appointed 15 April 2011.

Bishops

Ordinaries
Benito Fernández, O.F.M. (1837–1855) 
James Eustace Dupeyron, S.J. (1855–1872) 
Joseph Sidney Woollett, S.J. (1871–1877) 
Thomas Porter, S.J. (1877–1888) 
Charles Gordon, S.J. (1889–1906) 
John J. Collins, S.J. (1907–1918) 
William F. O'Hare, S.J. (1919–1926) 
Joseph N. Dinand, S.J. (1927–1930) 
Thomas Addis Emmet, S.J. (1930–1949) 
John J. McEleney, S.J. (1950–1970) 
Samuel Carter, S.J. (1970–1994)
Edgerton Clarke (1994–2004)
Lawrence Aloysius Burke, S.J. (2004–2008)
Donald James Reece (2008–2011)
Charles Dufour (2011–2016)
Kenneth Richards (2017–present)'''

Coadjutor bishop
James Eustace Dupeyron, S.J. (1851–1875), as Coadjutor Vicar Apostolic
Donald James Reece (2007–2008)

Auxiliary bishop
Samuel Carter, S.J. (1967–1970), appointed Archbishop here

Other priest of this diocese who became bishop
Burchell Alexander McPherson, appointed Bishop of Montego Bay, Jamaica in 2013

References

External links

Kingston, Jamaica
Roman Catholic dioceses in Jamaica
Religious organizations established in 1837
Roman Catholic dioceses and prelatures established in the 19th century
1837 establishments in Jamaica
A